The Premios Sur Award for Best Actress , is an award given annually by the Argentine Academy of Cinematography Arts and Sciences to the best actress in Argentina for that year. The award was suspended in 1955 with the military coup d'état known as the Revolución Libertadora and not revived until 2006, after the present Academy was founded in 2004.

References

Argentine film awards
Latin American cinema
Film awards for lead actress